Acrokeratosis verruciformis  is a rare autosomal dominant disorder appearing at birth or in early childhood, characterized by skin lesions that are small, verrucous, flat papules resembling warts along with palmoplantar punctate keratoses and pits. However sporadic forms, whose less than 10 cases have been reported, presents at a later age, usually after the first decade and generally lack palmoplantar keratoses.
Whether acrokeratosis verruciformis and Darier disease are related or distinct entities has been controversial, like Darier's disease, it is associated with defects in the ATP2A2 gene. however the specific mutations found in the ATP2A2 gene in acrokeratosis verruciformis have never been found in Darier's disease.

See also 
 List of cutaneous conditions
 List of genes mutated in cutaneous conditions

References

External links 

Genodermatoses